Waskesiu Lake, also referred to as Waskesiu, is a hamlet in Prince Albert National Park, Saskatchewan, Canada.

Most facilities and services one would expect to find in a multi-use park are available, such as souvenir shops, small grocery stores, restaurants, hotels and motels, rental cabins, campgrounds, three marinas, many beaches, picnic areas, tennis courts, lawn bowling greens, a gas station, laundromat, Royal Canadian Mounted Police (RCMP) detachment and a small movie theatre (which adds showings on rainy and cold days). The facilities and services combine recreational and nature experiences. Notably, the park contains the Waskesiu Golf Course designed by famed golf course architect Stanley Thompson who also designed the course in Banff National Park.

Demographics 
In 2011, Waskesiu had a population of 10 year-round residents.

Climate
Waskesiu experiences a humid continental climate (Köppen Dfb) bordering on a subarctic climate (Dfc).

See also
 List of communities in Saskatchewan
List of place names in Canada of Indigenous origin

References

External links 

Prince Albert National Park
Unincorporated communities in Saskatchewan